Gilmerton Cove is a series of underground passageways and chambers hand-carved from sandstone located beneath the streets of Gilmerton, an ex-mining village, now a southeastern suburb of Edinburgh, Scotland. There are many theories about the origins of the Cove and its purpose. 

A five-year collaborative project between Gilmerton Heritage Trust and The City of Edinburgh Council allowed the newly restored Cove to open in 2003 as an educational resource for the community as well as a place to visit.

18th Century 
In 1721 the cove was first mentioned in the local Kirk (church) minutes where George Paterson (a blacksmith or baker) was accused of selling alcohol on the sabbath to many people as they visited his 'caves'. 

Thomas Pennant's 1769 book A Tour In Scotland mentions the Cove in the context of Newbattle Abbey saying that "In the woods adjacent to this seat are some subterraneous (sic) apartments and passages cut out of the live rock: they seem to have been excavated by the ancient inhabitants of the country either as receptacles for their provisions, or a retreat for themselves and families in time of war, in the same manner, as Tacitus relates, as was customary with the old Germans."

Extensive archaeological and historical research has failed to resolve the mystery. In 2017, research by scientists from University of St Andrews and University of Edinburgh using ground-penetrating radar indicated that the network of passageways and chambers may be more extensive than that currently exposed. 

Popular theories are that it was used as a drinking den for local gentry, a Covenanters refuge, and a smugglers' lair. In 2007, the documentary television series Cities of the Underworld featured Gilmerton Cove in the episode Scotland's Sin City which postulates that the Cove was linked to a nearby Hellfire Club building via a secret passage.

See also
Tunnels in popular culture - Ley tunnels as escape tunnels, etc
Cleeves Cove - a natural cave system once used by Covenanters

References

External links
 The Mystery of Gilmerton Cove  official website
 The Scotsman: Secrets below the streets of Edinburgh
 Gilmerton Cove video - Part 1
 Gilmerton Cove video - Part 2
 A man made summer house cut from red sandstone.

Buildings and structures in Edinburgh
Conspiracy theories in the United Kingdom
Subterranea of the United Kingdom
Category B listed buildings in Edinburgh